Valero Serer Pascual (2 November 1932 – 31 July 2022) was a Spanish footballer who played as a forward.

He was Gimnàstic de Tarragona's all-time scoring leader, with 181 goals over the course of 11 seasons.

Career
Born in Valencia, Serer started his professional career with local CD Mestalla, scoring three goals in nine matches in Segunda División. In 1955, after one full season at CF Gandía, he joined Real Zaragoza also in the second level.

Serer achieved promotion to La Liga in his first campaign, also being the club's top goalscorer with 11 goals. He made his debut in the category on 14 October 1956, starting and scoring his team's only goal in a 4–1 away loss against Real Valladolid.

In December 1959 Serer was released, after falling down in the pecking order, and immediately joined Gimnàstic de Tarragona. With the granas he scored 181 goals over the course of 11 seasons, and retired in 1970 at the age of 38.

References

External links

1932 births
2022 deaths
Footballers from Valencia (city)
Spanish footballers
Association football forwards
La Liga players
Segunda División players
Tercera División players
Valencia CF Mestalla footballers
Real Zaragoza players
Gimnàstic de Tarragona footballers
CF Gandía players